In computing, find is a command in the command-line interpreters (shells) of a number of operating systems. It is used to search for a specific text string in a file or files. The command sends the specified lines to the standard output device.

Overview
The find command is a filter to find lines in the input data stream that contain or don't contain a specified string and send these to the output data stream. It does not support wildcard characters.

The command is available in DOS, Digital Research FlexOS, IBM/Toshiba 4690 OS, IBM OS/2, Microsoft Windows, and ReactOS. On MS-DOS, the command is available in versions 2 and later. DR DOS 6.0 and Datalight ROM-DOS include an implementation of the  command. The FreeDOS version was developed by Jim Hall and is licensed under the GPL.

The Unix command find performs an entirely different function, analogous to forfiles on Windows.  The rough equivalent to the Windows find is the Unix grep.

Syntax
FIND [/V] [/C] [/N] [/I] "string" [[drive:][path]filename[...]]

Arguments:
"string" This command-line argument specifies the text string to find.
[drive:][path]filename Specifies a file or files in which to search the specified string.

Flags:
/V Displays all lines NOT containing the specified string.
/C Displays only the count of lines containing the string.
/N Displays line numbers with the displayed lines.
/I Ignores the case of characters when searching for the string.

Note:
If a pathname is not specified, FIND searches the text typed at the prompt
or piped from another command.

Examples
C:\>find "keyword" < inputfilename > outputfilename

C:\>find /V "any string" FileName

See also
 Findstr, Windows and ReactOS command-line tool to search for patterns of text in files.
 find (Unix), a Unix command that finds files by attribute, very different from Windows find
 grep, a Unix command that finds text matching a pattern, similar to Windows find
 forfiles, a Windows command that finds files by attribute, similar to Unix find
 Regular expression
 List of DOS commands

References

Further reading

External links

Open source FIND implementation that comes with MS-DOS v2.0

External DOS commands
Microcomputer software
Microsoft free software
OS/2 commands
ReactOS commands
Pattern matching
Windows administration